Electrogenic sodium bicarbonate cotransporter 4 is a protein that in humans is encoded by the SLC4A5 gene.

Function 

This gene encodes a member of the sodium bicarbonate cotransporter (NBC) family, part of the bicarbonate transporter superfamily. Sodium bicarbonate cotransporters are involved in intracellular pH regulation and electroneural or electrogenic sodium bicarbonate transport. This protein is thought to be an integral membrane protein. Multiple transcript variants encoding different isoforms have been found for this gene, but the biological validity of some variants has not been determined.

Clinical significance 

This human gene has been identified as a hypertension susceptibility gene based on the association of single nucleotide polymorphisms with blood pressure (BP) levels and hypertension status.

See also

References

Further reading 

 
 
 
 
 

Solute carrier family